How to Play Golf is a 1944 short animated Walt Disney Productions film directed by Jack Kinney. Eight minutes long, it was distributed by RKO, and was a part of a series where Goofy learned to play various sports.

Reception
Upon release, The Film Daily called it "highly hilarious", and gave the following review:

Voice cast
 Goofy: Pinto Colvig
 Narrator: Fred Shields

Home media
The short was released on December 2, 2002, on Walt Disney Treasures: The Complete Goofy.

See also
List of American films of 1944

References

External links
 

1940s Disney animated short films
1944 films
1944 animated films
American sports comedy films
Golf animation
Goofy (Disney) short films
Films directed by Jack Kinney
Films produced by Walt Disney
1944 short films
American comedy short films
1940s sports comedy films
1944 comedy films
1940s English-language films